In algebra, a commutative ring R is said to be arithmetical (or arithmetic) if any of the following equivalent conditions hold:

The last two conditions both say that the lattice of all ideals of R is distributive.

An arithmetical domain is the same thing as a Prüfer domain.

References

External links

Ring theory